Tuyeh (also Romanized as Tūyeh and Tooyeh; also known as  Ţorūdbār, Turndbār, Turudbār, Tūyeh Darvār, Tūyeh Rūdbār, and Tūyeh-ye Rūdbār) is a village in Rudbar Rural District, in the Central District of Damghan County, Semnan Province, Iran. At the 2006 census, its population was 256, in 71 families.

References 

Populated places in Damghan County